Donbas State Technical University (DonSTU) is an institution of higher education located in Lysychansk, Ukraine. Today, the university is a major regional educational and scientific center in the field of technical education.

History
The Donbas State Technical University was founded on 12 October 1957. At that time, it was called Voroshylovsk Mining-Metallurgical Institute.

In 1964, due to the changing of the town's name, the university was renamed to Kommunarsk Mining-Metallurgical Institute. In 1992, it became Donbas Mining-Metallurgical Institute (DMMI).

By the order of the Ministry of Education and Science of Ukraine No. 622 of 27 July 2004, Donbas Mining-Metallurgical Institute was renamed Donbas State Technical University.

In November 2014, as a consequence of the War in Donbas, the university was temporarily moved to Lysychansk.

Structure
DonSTU has the following academic departments:
 Mining
 Metallurgical
 Civil Engineering
 Economics and Finances
 Mechanical Engineering
 Management
 Automation and Electro-technical Systems
 Foreign Student's department
 Training-consulting center "Osvita"
 Institute of advanced study and advanced training courses for managers and leaders
 College
 Scientific Library

The university has seven separate departments in these regional cities:
 Krasnyi Luch
 Lysychansk
 Krasnodon
 Sverdlovsk
 Rovenky
 Pervomaisk
 Yenakiyevo

It also has two technical schools:
 Industrial school in Alchevsk
 Mining school in Perevalsk

DonSTU has within its structure a scientific research department, a scientific research design institute, a state inter-institutional center for laser-location observation for artificial Earth satellites, the Donbas department of the East-Ukrainian branch of the Archeology Institute of NASU, the Alchevsk Branch of the institute of physics of mining processes of NASU, and the ministry of education and science. Scientific and technological activities of Donbas State Technical University are carried out according to priority development trends in science and engineering in Ukraine.
The institution's faculty also has a historical museum as well as a mining-mineralogical museum with a collection of minerals.
It has a sanatorium, a sports/recreation camp on the Azov coast, a culture and leisure center, and an art production center.

The university issues its own newspaper, Impulse.

Teachers and scientists
As of 2009, DonSTU had a staff of 614 regular teachers.

Education and science
DonSTU is one of the first Ukrainian institutions to put in place the Bologna system, and it has been recognized as a leading institution in the implementation of these new teaching methods.
Its main partners in scientific and educational spheres include universities in the United Kingdom, Hungary, Poland, Russia, Slovakia, and Turkey.

References

External links
 Donbas State Technical University website

Technical universities and colleges in Ukraine
Educational institutions established in 1957
1957 establishments in Ukraine